= Luis Buñuel bibliography =

A list of books and essays about Luis Buñuel:

- Buñuel, Luis (1 March 2002). An Unspeakable Betrayal: Selected Writings of Luis Buñuel. University of California Press. ISBN 978-0-520-23423-9.
- Durgnat, Raymond (1977). Luis Bunuel. University of California Press. ISBN 978-0-520-03424-2.
- Gubern, Román; Hammond, Paul (4 January 2012). Luis Buñuel: The Red Years, 1929–1939. University of Wisconsin Pres. ISBN 978-0-299-28474-9.
- Higginbotham, Virginia (1979). Luis Buñuel. Twayne Publishers. ISBN 978-0-8057-9261-4.
- Santaolalla, Isabel; Evans, Peter William (2004). Luis Bunuel: New Readings. British Film Institute. ISBN 978-1-84457-003-4.
